Ifthikarali Azeez is an Indian composer from Kasargod, Kerala who debuted on the Malayalam movie June.

Career
Ifthi was born at Trikaripur in Kasaragod district, Kerala. He released his album 'Dil Hai Deewana' in the year 2000 when he was studying in Class X. His album 'Mantra' was released in 2005. Ifthi released his first international musical project ‘Patchwork’ in 2012 which brought together 29 artists and 49 technicians from nine nations.

He debuted as a feature film composer with the Malayalam movie titled as June by Friday Film House.

Discography

References

External links
 
 
 

Living people
People from Kasaragod district
Musicians from Kerala
Malayalam film score composers
1983 births
Film musicians from Kerala
21st-century Indian composers